Rem Ivanovich Soloukhin (19 November 1930 – 6 January 1988) was a Soviet scientist, specializing in physics and mechanics.

Biography 

Rem Soloukhin was born in a teachers' family in Gus-Khrustalny, Soviet Union in 1930. He graduated from Faculty of Physics of Moscow State University in 1953 and became PhD in 1957.

In 1959, Soloukhin, together with Mikhail Lavrentiev, moved to work in Novosibirsk in Akademgorodok, where he developed a scientific direction at the Lavrentyev Institute of Hydrodynamics, which had already begun at the Krzhizhanovsky Energy Institute. In addition, he takes an active part in the creation of the Novosibirsk State University (NSU) and becomes the first dean of the Faculty of Physics, and then vice-rector for scientific and educational work.

In 1967, Soloukhin together with Antoni K. Oppenheim and Manson Numa established the International Committee on Gasdynamics of Explosions and Reactive Systems. He taught at Moscow Institute of Physics and Technology (1958–1959), then became a professor at Novosibirsk State University (1965), the first dean of Faculty of Physics and vice-chancellor (1962–1967).

From 1971 to 1976 he was director of the Institute of Theoretical and Applied Mechanics (ITAM) of the Siberian Branch of the USSR Academy of Sciences.

Since 1976, he lived and worked in Minsk.

From 1976 to 1987 he was director of the A. V. Lykov Institute of Heat and Mass Transfer of the Academy of Sciences of the BSSR and head of the Department of Thermal Physics at BSU named after V. I. Lenin.

Rem Soloukhin explored physics of combustion, explosion, and shock waves. Also, he was interested in gas dynamics and became the author of more than 400 scientific works. Soloukhin was awarded the Order of the October Revolution (1980), Order of the Red Banner of Labour (1967), and Order of the Badge of Honour (1961, 1975). In his memory, the grants for students of Novosibirsk State University and the international award for the best experimental work of Soloukhin's name were established.

References

1930 births
1988 deaths
Soviet physicists
Moscow State University alumni
Academic staff of the Moscow Institute of Physics and Technology
Academic staff of Novosibirsk State University
Scientists from Novosibirsk
People from Gus-Khrustalny